Alpheias baccalis is a species of snout moth in the genus Alpheias. It was described by Ragonot, in 1890, and is known from Sonora, Mexico.

References

Moths described in 1890
Cacotherapiini
Moths of Central America